Vigrahapala III (1055 – 1070 CE) was the successor to the Pala king Nayapala in the Bengal region of the Indian subcontinent, and twelfth ruler of the Pala line reigning for 15 years. He was succeeded by Mahipala II.

During the reign of Vigrahapala III, the Kalachuri king Karna once again invaded Bengal but was defeated. The conflict ended with a peace treaty, and Vigrahapala III married Karna's daughter Yauvanasri. Vigrahapala III was later defeated by the invading Chalukya king Vikramaditya VI. The invasion of Vikramaditya VI saw several soldiers from South India into Bengal, which explains the southern origin of the Sena Dynasty. Vigrahapala III also faced another invasion led by the Somavamsi king Mahasivagupta Yayati of Orissa. Subsequently, a series of invasions considerably reduced the power of the Palas. The Varmans occupied eastern Bengal during his reign. The emergent Sena dynasty seized Radha from the Palas, beginning the decline of their power in the region.

He was succeeded in quick succession by his three sons, starting with Mahipala II in 1070. The existence of another son named Prahasitaraja was confirmed by the Bangaon copper plate. Although this prince did not ascend the throne, he served as minister during his father's reign.

See also
List of rulers of Bengal

References

1070 deaths
Pala kings
1055 births
Indian Buddhist monarchs